Chloe Elizabeth Bailey (born July 1, 1998), also known by her mononymous stage name Chlöe, is an American singer, songwriter and actress. She is best known for being one half of the musical duo Chloe x Halle with her sister Halle Bailey. Together they have earned five Grammy Award nominations since 2018. In 2021, she debuted as a solo artist with "Have Mercy". Her first solo album In Pieces will be released in March 2023, and its lead single "Pray It Away" was released on January 27, 2023.

Career 
Chloe Bailey was raised in Mableton, Georgia, with her sister Halle Bailey and younger brother Branson Bailey (born October 3, 2005) and later moved to Los Angeles in mid-2012. While in Georgia, she played minor acting roles in films, including The Fighting Temptations (2003), starring Beyoncé, and the Disney television film Let It Shine (2012). Their dad began teaching them how to write songs at the ages of ten and eight. They launched a YouTube channel at the ages of 13 and 11 respectively, with a cover of Beyoncé's "Best Thing I Never Had". They first performed as Chloe x Halle when uploading covers of pop songs onto this channel. The duo made their talk show debut when they appeared on The Ellen Show in April 2012. In September 2013, she made a cameo appearance in the Disney series Austin & Ally performing the song "Unstoppable".
In 2015, she and her sister signed to Parkwood Entertainment.

In 2018, Bailey was cast as Jazlyn "Jazz" Forster on the TV series Grown-ish  after having sung the series's theme song "Grown". The song "The Kids Are Alright" was also featured in the series premiere. She departed the series at the end of the fourth season, when her character graduated from college.

In November 2019, it was announced that Bailey joined the cast of the horror film, The Georgetown Project, directed by M. A. Fortin and Joshua John Miller. She will also star alongside Madelaine Petsch in the 2022 psychological drama film Jane.

In August 2021, Bailey announced the release of her debut solo single, "Have Mercy". She had teased the Murda Beatz-produced song numerous times before. She revealed that the album was "90% done" and that it is more pop-oriented. On September 12, Bailey performed "Have Mercy" at the main show of the 2021 MTV Video Music Awards. At the 53rd NAACP Image Awards Bailey was nominated in three categories, including Outstanding Female Artist and Outstanding Soul/R&B Song for "Have Mercy".

In late August, Bailey co-starred alongside Kesha and Mason Gooding in the scripted podcast, Electric Easy, a show set in a futuristic Los Angeles in which humans struggle to co-exist with robots, known as "electrics". The show was created by Vanya Asher and executively produced by Kesha. The podcast premiered on August 30, 2021.

In April 2022, Bailey released "Treat Me" with an accompanying music video as her second solo single. She explained that the inspiration for the song came after a breakup, when she thought, "'It's time for me to just give myself the love that I'm looking for.'"

In November 2022, she sang the national anthem during Game 3 at the 2022 World Series.

On January 24, 2023, she announced her debut solo album, titled In Pieces, with a release date set for March 31, 2023. She released the lead single from the album, “Pray It Away,” on January 27, 2023 and the second single, “How Does It Feel,” on February 24, 2023.

Artistry 
Bailey's biggest musical influence is American singer Beyoncé, and has also stated Kelis is a major influence. She is also inspired by artists such as Grimes, Missy Elliott, Imogen Heap, Tune-Yards, and R&B music.

Discography

Studio albums

Singles

Other charted songs

Guest appearances

Tours 
 The In Pieces Tour (2023)

Filmography

Film

Television

Podcasts

Music videos 
 "Have Mercy" (2021)
 "You & Me"   (2022)
 "Treat Me" (2022)
 "Hello" (2022)
 "Surprise" (2022)
 "For The Night" (2022)
 "Pray It Away" (2023)
 “How Does It Feel” (2023)

Commercials

Awards and nominations

References

Notes

External links 
 
 

Living people
Chloe Bailey
Chloe x Halle
21st-century American actresses
21st-century American women singers
African-American actresses
African-American child actresses
American child actresses
African-American female dancers
African-American women singers
African-American record producers
African-American songwriters
American women singer-songwriters
American film actresses
American television actresses
American contemporary R&B singers
American women record producers
Musicians from Atlanta
People from Atlanta
People from Mableton, Georgia
Singer-songwriters from Georgia (U.S. state)
1998 births